Gallions Reach (1927) is a novel by H.M.Tomlinson first published by Heinemann in the UK and by Harper & Brothers in the US. It was republished by Penguin Books in 1952. It is a literary crime novel, initially set in London, in which Tomlinson uses real streets and locations for settings.

The protagonist, Jimmy Colet, commits a serious crime near the start of the novel, and, despite originally intending to give himself up, leaves London by ship soon afterwards.

Tomlinson uses the stream-of-consciousness technique throughout the novel.

External links
 Full text of Gallions Reach at the Internet Archive

1927 British novels
Heinemann (publisher) books
Harper & Brothers books